Podbórz may refer to the following places in Poland:
Podbórz, Lublin Voivodeship
Podbórz, West Pomeranian Voivodeship
Podbórz, Szczecin